Douglas C. Steltz (1920-2009) was a member of the Wisconsin State Assembly.

Biography
Steltz was born on December 7, 1920 in West Milwaukee, Wisconsin. He attended Carroll University, the Wisconsin State College of Milwaukee and Marquette University Law School. During World War II, he served in the United States Naval Air Corps. Steltz died on March 17, 2009.

Political career
Steltz was elected to the Assembly in 1944. He was a Democrat.

References

People from West Milwaukee, Wisconsin
Democratic Party members of the Wisconsin State Assembly
Military personnel from Wisconsin
20th-century American naval officers
United States Navy pilots of World War II
United States Navy personnel of World War II
Aviators from Wisconsin
Carroll University alumni
University of Wisconsin–Milwaukee alumni
Marquette University Law School alumni
1920 births
2009 deaths
20th-century American politicians